The University of Palangka Raya (UPR) is a state university located in Palangka Raya,
Central Kalimantan, in the Republic of Indonesia. The university was established on November 10, 1963, and is the first and the oldest state university in Central Kalimantan. UPR consists of eight faculties: Education, Economics and Business, Agriculture, Engineering, Law, Social and Political Science, Medicine, and Mathematics and Sciences. The rector is Prof. Dr. Ir.

Faculties
There are eight faculties and 36 undergraduate programs (S1) offered at University of Palangka Raya:
 Faculty of Education
 Faculty of Economics and Business
 Faculty of Agriculture
 Faculty of Engineering
 Faculty of Law
 Faculty of Social and Political Science 
 Faculty of Medicine
Faculty of Mathematics and Sciences

Postgraduate programs
The University of Palangka Raya offers a number of postgraduate courses:

 Master of Management
 Master of Natural Resources and Environment Management
 Master of English Education
 Master of Informal Education
 Master of Chemistry Education
 Master of Biology Education
 Master of Law
 Master of Economics
 Master of Primary Education
 Master of Economics Education
 Master of Social Science Education
 Doctor of Environmental Science

References

External links
 Official site

Universities in Indonesia
Educational institutions established in 1963
1963 establishments in Indonesia
Universities in Central Kalimantan
Indonesian state universities